F1 Pole Position is a 1992 racing video game for the SNES, developed by Human Entertainment and published by them in Japan, while the other versions were handled by Ubisoft. It is the first game in the Human Grand Prix/F1 Pole Position series, which features Formula One licensing.

Gameplay
The sixteen actual race courses from the 1992 Formula One season are used in the game. The opposition cars can pass through one another without crashing. There is also a bug for the Canadian Grand Prix where at the hairpin, the barriers have a gap enabling one to drive through and onto the grass.

Vehicles can be customized to adapt to the different race tracks. Everything can be changed; including the steering, gears, brakes, and suspension. There is an option for pit work to be manual or automatic, along with the option for automatic/manual gear shifting.

Related Game Boy game
In 1993, Ubisoft used the "F1 Pole Position" name for a localization of the Game Boy title Nakajima Satoru F-1 Hero GB '92: The Graded Driver, a sequel to Satoru Nakajima F-1 Hero GB World Championship '91. Although the games were made by Varie instead and are part of the separate F-1 Hero series, Human developed the first two for the Super Famicom.

Development and release
The game was developed and published by Human Entertainment with co-operation with Fuji Television and FOCA. Michael Andretti was used in the game instead of Ayrton Senna because his contract was secured with Sega for their Super Monaco GP II video game (however, in the Japanese release of the game the no. 1 McLaren features Ayrton Senna); Senna's helmet is clearly visible in the no. 1 McLaren in the North American release.

In the European version of the game tobacco sponsorship is missing from the cars. These sponsors appear on the Japanese version.

The game was released on November 20, 1992 in Japan. The Japanese release is single-player only. A multiplayer mode was added when the game was localized to North America.

Sequels
 F1 Pole Position 2
 Human Grand Prix III: F1 Triple Battle
 Human Grand Prix IV: F1 Dream Battle
 F1 Pole Position 64

Notes

References

1992 video games
Formula One video games
Human Entertainment games
Human Grand Prix Series
Super Nintendo Entertainment System games
Super Nintendo Entertainment System-only games
Ubisoft games
Video games developed in Japan
Video games set in 1992
Multiplayer and single-player video games
Video games set in Australia
Video games set in Brazil
Video games set in Belgium
Video games set in Canada
Video games set in France
Video games set in Germany
Video games set in Hungary
Video games set in Italy
Video games set in Japan
Video games set in Mexico
Video games set in Monaco
Video games set in Portugal
Video games set in South Africa
Video games set in Spain
Video games set in the United Kingdom